The 1978 season was the second in the National Soccer League for Adelaide City Football Club. In addition to the domestic league, Adelaide City competed in the NSL Cup.

Players

Competitions

Overall record

National Soccer League

League table

Results summary

Results by round

Matches

NSL Cup

Statistics

Appearances and goals
Includes all competitions. Players with no appearances not included in the list.

Disciplinary record
Includes all competitions. The list is sorted by squad number when total cards are equal. Players with no cards not included in the list.

Clean sheets
Includes all competitions. The list is sorted by squad number when total clean sheets are equal. Numbers in parentheses represent games where both goalkeepers participated and both kept a clean sheet; the number in parentheses is awarded to the goalkeeper who was substituted on, whilst a full clean sheet is awarded to the goalkeeper who was on the field at the start of play. Goalkeepers with no clean sheets not included in the list.

References

Adelaide City FC seasons
Adelaide City